Coleophora halothamni is a moth of the family Coleophoridae.

The larvae feed on Halothamnus subaphyllus. They feed on the generative organs of their host plant.

References

halothamni
Moths described in 1989